Rubén Belima Rodríguez (born 11 February 1992) is a professional footballer who plays as a left winger for Campeonato de Portugal club Rio Maior SC. Born in Spain, he represents the Equatorial Guinea national team.

Club career
Belima was born in Móstoles, Community of Madrid, Spain. He began his career with FC Torrevieja before joining the youth ranks of Real Madrid, and making his way into their C-team. He made his professional debut with the reserve team in Segunda División on 4 May 2014, as an 85th-minute substitute for Burgui in a 1–1 home draw with fellow strugglers Real Jaén CF.

After 18 months in Slovenia with FC Koper, Belima returned to the Iberian Peninsula on 31 July 2017, signing for Leixões S.C. of Portugal's LigaPro for one year with the option of a second. He scored four times in 24 games for the club from Matosinhos – including the only one of a home victory over F.C. Paços de Ferreira in the Taça da Liga groups on 20 September – before making the journey back to the previous country to NK Domžale.

On 28 January 2019 Belima was back in Portugal's second tier, with G.D. Estoril Praia. He scored once in the remainder of the season, albeit in the 4–2 loss at F.C. Penafiel that ended the team's hope of promotion to the Primeira Liga.

International career
Belima made his international debut for Equatorial Guinea on 16 November 2013 in a friendly against his birth country Spain in Malabo; he was a last-minute substitute for Juvenal Edjogo-Owono in the 2–1 loss. The game was however stricken from the FIFA records as the host team had not given sufficient notice that the referee would be a compatriot.

Equatorial Guinea were given the hosting rights to the 2015 Africa Cup of Nations when Morocco withdrew due to the Ebola virus epidemic, and Belima was named in their squad. He was a substitute in the opening match against the Congo and the quarter-final, before starting the semi-final and play-off as the team came fourth.

References

External links
 
 
 
 

1992 births
Living people
People from Móstoles
Citizens of Equatorial Guinea through descent
Spanish footballers
Footballers from the Community of Madrid
Equatoguinean footballers
Association football wingers
Tercera División players
Segunda División B players
Segunda División players
CD Torrevieja players
Real Madrid C footballers
Real Madrid Castilla footballers
SD Logroñés players
Slovenian PrvaLiga players
FC Koper players
NK Domžale players
Liga Portugal 2 players
Leixões S.C. players
G.D. Estoril Praia players
Hércules CF players
CD Móstoles URJC players
Segunda Federación players
Equatorial Guinea international footballers
2015 Africa Cup of Nations players
Equatoguinean expatriate footballers
Expatriate footballers in Slovenia
Equatoguinean expatriate sportspeople in Portugal
Expatriate footballers in Portugal
Equatoguinean sportspeople of Spanish descent
Spanish expatriate footballers
Spanish expatriate sportspeople in Slovenia
Spanish expatriate sportspeople in Portugal
Spanish sportspeople of Equatoguinean descent
Equatoguinean expatriate sportspeople in Slovenia
2021 Africa Cup of Nations players